Radio Sessions may refer to:

Radio Sessions (Curve album)
Radio Sessions, album by Alternative TV 
Radio Sessions: 1971-1973, Stackridge (2012)
Radio Sessions 1974 & 1978, Budgie
Radio Sessions '83–'84, compilation album by British rock band New Model Army 1988 
Radio Sessions 1969-1972, album by  Stone the Crows (2009)
Radio Sessions 69 to 71, album by   Blodwyn Pig and Mick Abrahams
Radio Sessions, album by  Tarwater (2011)

See also
 Live at the BBC
 BBC Radio Sessions